Leucanopsis umbrina is a moth of the family Erebidae. It was described by Walter Rothschild in 1910. It is found in Brazil and Peru.

References

umbrina
Moths described in 1910